The Finland–Taiwan relations are informal and largely economic. Finland acknowledged the People's Republic of China as the legitimate government of China on 13 January 1950 and the diplomatic relations were established in October the same year. Taiwan has formal diplomatic relations with only 14 countries, out of which the only European one is the Holy See. The government of Finland tends to use the designation Taiwan instead of Republic of China.

A representative office of Taiwan was opened in Helsinki in 1990 and a corresponding Finnish office to Taipei a year later. These offices function as de facto embassies as the countries have no formal diplomatic relations.

In May 2020, Taiwan donated 200 000 surgical masks to the Northern Finnish healthcare district and they were received by Mikko Kärnä, who is the chair of the Taiwan friendship club of the Finnish parliament.

References 

 
Finland
Taiwan